Alan J. Viergutz (born 1953) is the president of Grupo Centec. Viergutz is a former president of the Venezuelan Oil Chamber and works additionally as an oil-industry analyst.

Early life and education
Viergutz graduated from Phillips Exeter Academy in 1970 and attended Stanford University and Claremont College between 1970 and 1977, where he received a bachelor's degree in industrial engineering, a master’s in mechanical engineering, and an MBA. Afterwards he received a PhD.

Career
Viergutz is a former president of the Venezuelan Oil Chamber. He was one of the first analysts to alert the wider industry to the problems resulting from the "Aperture" of the Caldera government and the attempts by Hugo Chavez to convert the Venezuelan Oil Industry into a tool in developing a socialistic State. Viergutz now serves as president and chairman of Grupo Centec, a group of six Venezuelan petroleum-related firms. In addition to his work with Grupo Centec Viergutz works as an oil industry analyst out of Caracas, commenting in the media regarding trends related to the industry, such as OPEC policies. Viergutz authored the self-published book 1995-2001, Years of Upheaval in the Venezuelan Oil Industry, released in 2002. He has also commented on other aspects of Venezuelan society in the media, including political and social current events, in addition to foreign-based oil-related events.

Viergutz has acted as advisor to the Venezuelan government and has represented Venezuelan petroleum interests abroad at events like the 1996 OPEC Convention and the World Petroleum Congress. Venezuelan commissions and governing bodies he has sat on have included the National Petrochemical Commission, the Economic Commission of the Chamber of Deputies, the Advisory Commission of the Ministry of Energy and Mines, and the Energy and Mines Commission of the Congress of the Republic. In the public sector he has served on the Council of Venezuelan and US Managers and the Pro-Defensa del Petróleo. In the private sector he has also served as the Director of Fedecámaras, the National Chamber of Commerce and Industry, and Director of Consecomercio, the National Chamber of Commerce in Venezuela.

Personal life
In 2021, Viergutz bought an 11 million dollar mansion in Key Biscayne (Florida, United States).

References

1953 births
Venezuelan chief executives
Stanford University alumni
Businesspeople in the oil industry
Living people
Place of birth missing (living people)